"The Man" is a song by American vocalist Aloe Blacc. First included on his EP Wake Me Up, the song was later released as the second single from his third studio album, 2014's Lift Your Spirit, on Interscope Records. Blacc co-wrote the track with Sam Barsh, Daniel Seeff, and its producer DJ Khalil and Alex Finkin; Elton John and Bernie Taupin received songwriting credits as well, due to the song's interpolation of the line "You can tell everybody" from John's 1970 single "Your Song".

The song is Blacc's most successful single as a solo artist to date; it sold 2.5 million copies in the United States as of December 2014, peaking at number eight on the Billboard Hot 100. Outside the United States, "The Man" topped the charts in the United Kingdom and peaked within the top ten of the charts in Australia, New Zealand, the Republic of Ireland and Sweden. On January 22, 2014, a remix of "The Man" featuring American rapper Kid Ink was released.

Music video
A lyric video to accompany the release of "The Man" was first released to YouTube on January 10, 2014.

The song's official music video followed on March 3, 2014.  The video takes place in the 1960s and 1970s and gives tribute to figures and events significant to African American culture during that era.

Below is a list of tributes to people/events in the music video.

0:39 Marvin Gaye What's Going On album cover 
0:39-0:54 Violence and racial injustice at the time 
0:54-1:12 Civil Rights and Vietnam war protest 
1:12-1:45 Louis Armstrong or Clifford Brown 
1:45-2:25 Marvin Gaye 
2:25-2:57 Muhammad Ali 
2:57-3:05 Soul Train 
3:19-3:37 Malcolm X 
3:37-3:49 Martin Luther King Jr. 
3:49---- Martin Luther King Jr. (continued until the end) 
3:59---- Selma to Montgomery marches aka "Bloody Sunday" 
4:18---- 1968 Olympics Black Power salute (back, right corner)

In popular culture
The song was featured in the end credits of the 2014 film Brick Mansions.

This song was also famously used in a video on TikTok that featured NBA player Patrick Beverley celebrating after defeating the Los Angeles Clippers in the 2022 NBA Play-In.

Commercials
In December 2013, "The Man" was used as the soundtrack for a series of Beats by Dre commercials promoting the company's "Hear What You Want" campaign, which featured several notable sports personalities, including NFL players Richard Sherman of the Seattle Seahawks and Colin Kaepernick of the San Francisco 49ers, NBA player Kevin Garnett of the Brooklyn Nets, and Chelsea FC football player Cesc Fabregas, wearing Beats headphones to block out the sound of heckling from disgruntled fans.

The song was used extensively at the 2014 NFL Draft, being played 108 times over the course of the three-day event. MLB also used the song for its ads for the 2014 MLB All-Star Game. The ad shows different highlights and celebrations of possible All-Stars for 2014.

Charts

Weekly charts

Year-end charts

Certifications

Release history

References

External links
Lyrics at official website

2013 songs
2014 singles
Aloe Blacc songs
Songs with music by Elton John
Songs with lyrics by Bernie Taupin
Interscope Records singles
Number-one singles in Scotland
UK Singles Chart number-one singles
Song recordings produced by DJ Khalil
Songs written by DJ Khalil
Songs written by Sam Barsh
Songs written by Aloe Blacc